Zinc finger protein 208 is a protein that in humans is encoded by the ZNF208 gene.

Function

Zinc finger proteins (ZNFs), such as ZNF208, bind DNA and, through this binding, regulate gene transcription. Most ZNFs contain conserved C2H2 motifs and are classified as Kruppel-type zinc fingers. A conserved protein motif, termed the Kruppel-associated box (KRAB) domain, mediates protein-protein interactions (Eichler et al., 1998 [PubMed 9724325]). See ZNF91 (MIM 603971) for further information on ZNFs.

References

Further reading 

Molecular biology
Proteins
Proteomics